Yalla (Arabic: يلا, 'come on' or 'hurry up') may refer to:

Music 
Yalla (band), a folk rock band from Uzbekistan
Yalla!, a 2011 album by Thomas White
 "Yalla" (Inna song), 2015
 "Yalla" (Capital T song), 2020
 "Yalla", a song by Arash from the 2005 album Arash 
 "Yalla", a song by Calogero from the 2004 album 3
 "Yalla Yalla", a song by Joe Strummer and the Mescaleros from the 1999 album Rock Art and the X-Ray Style
 "Yalla Yalla (Let's Go)", a song by Cracker from the 2009 album Sunrise in the Land of Milk and Honey

Other uses
Yalla (journal), focusing on humanizing the Israeli–Palestinian conflict

See also

 Yala (disambiguation)
 Jalla (disambiguation)
 Yalla-y-Poora (disambiguation)
 Yallah, New South Wales
 Yallahs, a town in Jamaica